Grigorescu is a Romanian surname. Notable people with the surname include:
Alexandra Grigorescu, author of Cauchemar, 2016 nominee for the Sunburst Award
Dinu Grigoresco (1914-2001), Romanian and French painter
Eremia Grigorescu (1863–1919), Romanian general of artillery during World War I
Ion Grigorescu (born 1945), Romanian painter
Lucian Grigorescu (1894–1965), Romanian post-impressionist painter
Nicolae Grigorescu (1838–1907), one of the founders of modern Romanian painting
Bucharest National University of Arts, called the Nicolae Grigorescu Fine Arts Institute from 1948 to 1990
Nicolae Grigorescu metro station

Romanian-language surnames
Patronymic surnames
Surnames from given names